Armando Martinez (born January 6, 1976) is a Democratic member of the Texas House of Representatives, serving since 2005. Martinez is also a firefighter and paramedic. He earned a Bachelor of Science degree from the University of Texas-Pan American in Edinburg, Texas.

On January 1, 2017, Martinez was seriously wounded in the head by a stray bullet during a New Year's celebration, a case of celebratory gunfire.

References

External links
 
Legislative page

Democratic Party members of the Texas House of Representatives
American firefighters
Hispanic and Latino American state legislators in Texas
1976 births
Living people
People from Weslaco, Texas
University of Texas–Pan American alumni
21st-century American politicians